Blue is the debut studio album by Swiss musical duo Double, released on 15 October 1985 by Metronome. In addition to updated versions of two of the band's earlier singles ("Woman of the World" and "Rangoon Moon"), the album includes the ballad "The Captain of Her Heart", which was an immediate success throughout Europe (and eventually, the United States) upon its 1986 single release. Follow-up singles "Your Prayer Takes Me Off" and "Tomorrow" were less successful.

Track listing
All tracks are written by Kurt Maloo and Felix Haug.

 "Woman of the World" – 3:52
 "I Know a Place" – 3:40
 "The Captain of Her Heart" – 4:35
 "Your Prayer Takes Me Off" – 6:20
 "Rangoon Moon" – 4:01
 "Urban Nomads" – 4:55
 "Love Is a Plane" – 3:40
 "Tomorrow" – 4:35

Personnel
Credits adapted from the liner notes of Blue.

 Double – production
 Phil Carmen – engineering
 René Tinner – engineering
 Christian Ostermeier – saxophone, flute
 Bob Morgan – trombone solo on "Woman of the World"
 Thomas Jordi – Fretless bass on "Tomorrow"
 Liz McComb – additional vocals on "I Know a Place" and "Your Prayer Takes Me Off"
 Hans Inauen – cover design
 Barbara Davatz – photography (indoors)
 Marco Schaaf – photography (outdoors)

Charts

Weekly charts

Year-end charts

References

1985 debut albums
A&M Records albums
Double (band) albums
Polydor Records albums